Devin Bye Morgan (born December 25, 1993) is an American soccer player.

Career

College and Amateur
Morgan played four years of college soccer, three at Cornell University from 2012 to 2014, and one further year at St. John's University in 2015.
At the conclusion of his senior year at Cornell, Morgan was named a Second Team All-Ivy Selection after captaining his side to a program record 11 clean sheets and allowing only 11 goals over 17 games.

Professional
Morgan signed his first professional contract with United Soccer League side Tulsa Roughnecks on July 15, 2016.

 He made his debut the following day in a 2-0 victory over Saint Louis FC.

Morgan signed on with Swedish team Södertälje FK for the 2017 season. Multiple injuries prevented Morgan from making more than 3 appearances over the course of the season.

Morgan signed on with Icelandic team Leiknir F. for the 2019 season. Morgan helped the team to a league championship and promotion to Inkasso. Leiknir F. conceded the fewest goals in the league, surrendering 22 goals in 22 games. Morgan was voted to the "team of the season" (left central defender) at the conclusion of the season.

References

External links
 

1993 births
Living people
American soccer players
Cornell Big Red men's soccer players
St. John's Red Storm men's soccer players
FC Tulsa players
Association football defenders
Soccer players from New York (state)
USL Championship players